Pseudonocardia spinosispora is a bacterium from the genus of Pseudonocardia which has been isolated from soil from a gold mine in Kongju on Korea.

References

Pseudonocardia
Bacteria described in 2002